Organizational economics (also referred to as economics of organization) involves the use of economic logic and methods to understand the existence, nature, design, and performance of organizations, especially managed ones.

Organizational economics is primarily concerned with the obstacles to coordination of activities inside and between organizations (firms, alliances, institutions, and market as a whole).

Organizational economics is known for its contribution to and its use of:
 Transaction cost theory: costs incurred to organize an activity, especially regarding research of information, bureaucracy, communication etc.
 Agency theory: dilemmas connected to making decisions on behalf of, or that impact, another person or entity.
 Contract theory: ways economic actors use to construct contractual arrangements, generally in the presence of asymmetric information.

Notable theorists and contributors in the field of organizational economics:

Kenneth Arrow
James March 
Herbert Simon 
Oliver Williamson 
Ronald Coase
Bengt Holmström 
Oliver Hart
Jean Tirole
Joseph Stiglitz

References 

Market trends
Subfields of economics
Bureaucratic organization
Organizational theory